Muthur is a panchayat town in Kangeyam taluk in Tirupur district, Tamil Nadu, India.

Demographics
The Muthur Town Panchayat has population of 13,212 of which 6,588 are males while 6,624 are females as per report released by Census India 2011. Population of Children with age of 0-6 is 1003 which is 7.59% of total population of Muthur (TP). In Muthur Town Panchayat, Female Sex Ratio is of 1005 against state average of 996. Moreover, Child Sex Ratio in Muthur is around 889 compared to Tamil Nadu state average of 943. Literacy rate of Muthur city is 70.61% lower than state average of 80.09%. In Muthur, Male literacy is around 79.78% while female literacy rate is 61.59%.

Politics
Muthur is part of Erode (Lok Sabha constituency).

Muthur is part of Kangeyam (tamilnadu assembly constituency)

Transport
 Muthur is connect by roads to many major towns in the district.Muthur is located on National Highway NH 381A connects Muthur with Erode. Muthur is about 39km from Erode, 12km from Vellakovil, 50km from Dharapuram, 50km from Tiruppur, 47km from Karur, 88km from Coimbatore.

Muthur Town Panchayat has one Bus stand situated in erode road in which all far away busses comes regularly. There is frequently bus available For Erode , Dharapuram , Vellakovil , Kangayam , Mulanur and Limited bus available for Coimbatore, Tiruppur , Karur , Oddanchatram , Palani , Dindugal.

Education
The town is having both government and private educational institutions for schooling. Government institutions include one (men's and girls) higher secondary school (MGHSS) in Muthur to Kodumudi road and one co-ed middle school near to Muthur bus stand which gets its students from rural areas in and around Muthur town. The town is studded with three  private schools namely KKP, Anoor and Vivekanandha matriculation higher secondary schools. There is also a CBSE school named Nava international school Nava Girls college which comes under the Vivekanandha school. All these private schools have hostel facilities.
 Government Schools
Government Higher Secondary School
Elementary School, Muthur.
Elementary School, Chinnamuthur.
Matriculation Schools
Aanoor Vidyalaya Matriculation Higher Secondary School
Vivekanandha Matriculation Hr Sec School
KKP Matriculation Higher Secondary School
CBSE Schools
Nava
Colleges
Karuppannan Mariappan College for Arts & Science

Attractions  
 Noyyal check dam, Chinna muthur

Hospitals 
 Primary health center 
 Ramalingam Clinic
 Sri Balaji hospital
 RajaMohan Hospital
 Malar Hospital

Nearby cities 
 Erode (39km)
 Dharapuram (50km)
 Tiruppur (50km) 
 Oddanchatram (70Km)
 Karur (47 km) 
 Coimbatore (88 km) 
 Vellakovil (12km)
 Palani (78 km)

Cities and towns in Tiruppur district